The University of Michigan Consumer Sentiment Index is a consumer confidence index published monthly by the University of Michigan. The index is normalized to have a value of 100 in the first quarter of 1966. Each month at least 500 telephone interviews are conducted of a contiguous United States sample. Fifty core questions are asked.

The consumer confidence measures were devised in the late 1940s by Professor George Katona at the University of Michigan. They have now developed into an ongoing, nationally representative survey based on telephonic household interviews. The Index of Consumer Sentiment (ICS) is developed from these interviews. The Index of Consumer Expectations (a sub-index of ICS) is included in the Leading Indicator Composite Index published by the U.S. Department of Commerce, Bureau of Economic Analysis.

Objectives
The Index was created and still is published with the following objectives:
 To assess near-time consumer attitudes on the business climate, personal finance, and spending
 To promote an understanding of, and to forecast changes in, the national economy
 To provide a means of incorporating empirical measures of consumer expectations into models of spending and saving behavior
 To gauge the economic expectations and probable future spending behavior of the consumer
 To judge the consumer's level of optimism or pessimism

Inputs
The Index of Consumer Expectations seeks to find how consumers view three things:
 Their own financial situation
 The short-term general economy 
 The long-term general economy

Implications
The Index has implications that can influence the value of the dollar, stocks, and bonds. Thomson Reuters used to be an exclusive distributor of the University of Michigan's survey results.

CNBC reported on 12 June 2013 that the University of Michigan provided Thomson Reuters news service with the data early, so that Reuters could release the CSI to select, paying clients at 9:55 a.m., five minutes before it released the data to the general public on its web site at 10:00 a.m. In addition, Reuters released the data via high speed communication channels to select clients two seconds earlier. CNBC revealed that trading activity increased dramatically within milliseconds of 9:54:58 a.m. Traders who subscribed to either service were able to take advantage of the CSI before the university released it to the public. Former Securities and Exchange Commission Chairman Harvey Pitt opined that this might present a fairness issue and destroy confidence in the market by the public.

Thomson Reuters announced on 8 July 2013 that it was suspending its early release practice as part of an agreement with the New York Attorney General's office.

The University of Michigan stated it received about a million dollars a year from Reuters for this advance information, but said it couldn't do the research without the Reuters payment.

Since January 2015, Index data is available from multiple sources including University's website, Bloomberg, and Macrobond.

See also
 Consumer Confidence Index
 FRED (Federal Reserve Economic Data)

References

External links
 

Consumer confidence
University of Michigan